Markarian (Armentian: Մարգարյան) or its Eastern Armenian variant Margaryan, is a common Armenian family name.

Markarian may refer to:

Persons
Benjamin Markarian (1913–1985), Armenian astrophysicist
Henri Markarian  (1926-1985), better known as Marc Aryan, well-known Armenian-Belgian international singer 
Hrant Markarian (born 1958), Armenian politician and head of the ARF
Roberto Markarian (born 1946), Uruguayan-Armenian mathematician, Rector of the University of the Republic 2014-2018
Ronald Markarian (born 1931), United States Air Force Major General
Sergio Markarián (born 1944), Uruguayan-Armenian football coach and coach of national football team of Greece
Tatoul Markarian (born 1964), Armenian Ambassador most notably to the United States

Space
Markarian's Chain,a stretch of galaxies that forms part of the Virgo Cluster
Markarian galaxies, including a list of galaxies that include the name Markarian

See also
Margaryan (disambiguation), Eastern Armenian variant of Markarian

Armenian-language surnames